Stuart Jason Hicks (born 30 May 1967 in Peterborough) is a former professional footballer who played as a defender.

Playing career
Hicks began his career with hometown club Peterborough United, where he turned professional in August 1984. However he failed to make any league appearances for the Posh and he subsequently went on loan to non-league Wisbech Town. After returning he moved to Colchester United in March 1988 and remained there until they were relegated out of The Football League in 1990.

Hicks then had spells with Scunthorpe United, Doncaster Rovers, Huddersfield Town, Preston North End and Scarborough before returning south when he joined Leyton Orient in August 1997. After 78 league appearances for Orient, Hicks joined The Football League's bottom club Chester City in February 2000.

Despite making his debut in a club record 7–1 home defeat by Brighton & Hove Albion, Hicks struck up a tremendous rapport with the Chester fans as the club fought valiantly but unsuccessfully against relegation. Hicks popularity with the supporters was such that he finished third in the player of the season awards after playing just 13 games for the club. However, he opted to remain in Division Three and joined Mansfield Town. Hicks was to have an injury hit spell at Field Mill and he announced his retirement from professional football in February 2002. He then joined non-league side Hucknall Town to complete his playing days.

Since retiring from the game, he has moved into men's designer clothing. He opened his first Mainline Menswear store in Scarborough, North Yorkshire, in 2002.

Honours

Club
Scunthorpe United
 Football League Fourth Division Playoff Runner-up (1): 1991–92

Preston North End
 Football League Division Three Playoff Runner-up (1): 1993–94

Leyton Orient
 Football League Division Three Playoff Runner-up (1): 1998–99

References

External links

1967 births
Living people
Sportspeople from Peterborough
English footballers
Peterborough United F.C. players
Wisbech Town F.C. players
Colchester United F.C. players
Scunthorpe United F.C. players
Doncaster Rovers F.C. players
Huddersfield Town A.F.C. players
Preston North End F.C. players
Scarborough F.C. players
Leyton Orient F.C. players
Chester City F.C. players
Mansfield Town F.C. players
Hucknall Town F.C. players
English Football League players
Association football defenders
People from Seamer, Scarborough